Seedy Ishmail Njie (born 1 December 1994) is an English footballer who plays as a forward. He currently plays for Isthmian League Division One South club Cray Wanderers.

Career
Born in Lewisham, Njie started a two-year scholarship with Southend United in July 2011. His professional debut for Southend came on 14 August 2012, in a 4–0 defeat to Peterborough United in the Football League Cup, replacing Elliot Benyon as a substitute.

On 27 March 2014, Njie joined Conference South side Concord Rangers on loan until the end of the 2013–14 season.

On 15 August 2014 it was announced that Njie had joined Billericay Town.

On 24 March 2016, Njie joined Chelmsford City.

For the 2016–17 season, Njie joined Cray Wanderers.

References

External links

1994 births
Footballers from Lewisham
Living people
English footballers
Association football forwards
Southend United F.C. players
Bishop's Stortford F.C. players
Histon F.C. players
Concord Rangers F.C. players
Billericay Town F.C. players
Chelmsford City F.C. players
English Football League players
National League (English football) players
Cray Wanderers F.C. players